Nataša Šešum is a Professor of mathematics at Rutgers University, specializing in partial differential equations and geometric flow.

Education 
Šešum earned her PhD in 2004 from the Massachusetts Institute of Technology under the supervision of Gang Tian. Her dissertation was Limiting Behavior of Ricci Flows.

Awards and honors 
Šešum was an invited speaker at the International Congress of Mathematicians in 2014.
In 2015 she was elected as a fellow of the American Mathematical Society. She was named MSRI Simons Professor for 2015–2016.

References

External links
Home page

Year of birth missing (living people)
Living people
21st-century American mathematicians
American women mathematicians
Massachusetts Institute of Technology alumni
Rutgers University faculty
Fellows of the American Mathematical Society
Differential geometers
21st-century women mathematicians
21st-century American women